Stanislav Griga (born 4 November 1961) is a Slovak football manager and former player. He played 34 matches for Czechoslovakia and scored eight goals.

Career
Griga was a participant in the 1990 FIFA World Cup, and had a headed goal controversially disallowed for offside in a first-round game against Italy at Stadio Olimpico.

Griga joined Sparta Prague as manager in October 2005. He stayed at Sparta until August 2006, finishing with a record of 12 wins, 7 draws and 8 losses in his 27 games in charge.

On 26 April 2012, Griga was named as joint coach of the Slovakia national team with Michal Hipp, who has served as interim coach since January. In June 2013, Griga and Hipp were sacked from their positions with the Slovakia national team and replaced by Ján Kozák.

Honours

Player
Sparta Prague
Czechoslovak First League: 1983–84, 1984–85, 1987–88, 1988–89, 1989–90
Czechoslovak Cup: 1983–84, 1987–88, 1988–89

Feyenoord
KNVB Cup: 1990–91, 1991–92
Dutch Super Cup: 1991
UEFA Cup Winners' Cup semi-finalist: 1991–92

Czechoslovakia
FIFA World Cup quarter-finalist: 1990

Individual
Czechoslovak First League top scorer: 1985–86 (19 goals)

Manager
MŠK Žilina
2. Liga (Slovakia) runner-up: 1995–96 (promoted)

Slovan Bratislava
Slovak First League: 1998–99
Slovak Cup: 1998–99

Slovan Liberec
UEFA Intertoto Cup finalist: 2004

FK Senica
Slovak First League runner-up: 2010–11
Slovak Cup runner-up: 2011–12

References

External links
 

1961 births
Living people
Sportspeople from Žilina
Czechoslovak footballers
Slovak footballers
Czechoslovakia international footballers
1990 FIFA World Cup players
MŠK Žilina players
AC Sparta Prague players
Dukla Prague footballers
Feyenoord players
SK Rapid Wien players
Austrian Football Bundesliga players
Eredivisie players
Czechoslovak expatriate footballers
Slovak expatriate footballers
Slovak expatriate sportspeople in the Netherlands
Czechoslovak expatriate sportspeople in the Netherlands
Expatriate footballers in the Netherlands
Slovak expatriate sportspeople in Austria
Czechoslovak expatriate sportspeople in Austria
Expatriate footballers in Austria
Slovak football managers
Slovak Super Liga managers
Czech First League managers
Slovak expatriate football managers
MŠK Žilina managers
ŠK Slovan Bratislava managers
FC Slovan Liberec managers
AC Sparta Prague managers
FK Viktoria Žižkov managers
AS Trenčín managers
FK Senica managers
FK Dubnica managers
MFK Zemplín Michalovce managers
Slovakia national football team managers
Slovakia national under-21 football team managers
Association football forwards